Billy Ray Dungy II (born January 14, 1959), known professionally as Jesse Hunter, is an American country music artist.

Hunter signed to BNA Records in 1994, the same year that he released his Barry Beckett-produced debut album A Man Like Me. The album produced three chart singles in "Born Ready," "The Way She's Lookin'" and "Long Legged Hannah (From Butte, Montana)," his highest-charting single at No. 42 on the Billboard Hot Country Songs charts. "Born Ready" and "Long Legged Hannah" also charted on the RPM country charts in Canada. Michael Hight of New Country magazine gave Hunter's debut album a three-and-a-half star rating out of five, comparing his voice to Johnny Cash's and saying "the renegade nature[…]positions him as a folk hero who has lived and learned and is ready to talk about it."

Dungy has not recorded professionally since. As of 2021, he resides in Watertown, Tennessee, and has written local theatre productions.

Discography

Studio albums

Singles

Music videos

References

American country singer-songwriters
Living people
Singer-songwriters from Tennessee
People from Shelby County, Tennessee
BNA Records artists
1959 births
Country musicians from Tennessee